Llanfair (Welsh for "St. Mary's Parish") may refer to:

Places
Llanfair Clydogau; a small village in Mid Wales
Llanfair, Gwynedd, a village in the Ardudwy area of Gwynedd
Llanfair-is-gaer, a former parish in Arfon, Gwynedd
Llanfair, Vale of Glamorgan, a community near Cowbridge
Llanfair Caereinion, Powys; a small town in east central Wales
Llanfair PG (Llanfairpwllgwyngyll), Anglesey; a village and community on the island of Anglesey in Wales
Llanfair-Nant-Gwyn, hamlet in Pembrokeshire
Llanfair Dyffryn Clwyd, a village and community in Denbighshire, Wales
Llanfair, Alabama, USA

Fiction
Llanfair (One Life to Live), the Lord family mansion on the American soap opera One Life to Live

Other uses
"Llanfair", a popular Welsh hymn tune; see "Christ the Lord Is Risen Today"

See also